William Joseph Bellas (21 May 1925 – 1994) was an English professional footballer who played as a defender.

References

1925 births
1994 deaths
People from Crosby, Merseyside
English footballers
Association football defenders
Marine F.C. players
Notts County F.C. players
Grimsby Town F.C. players
Nottingham Forest F.C. players
Mansfield Town F.C. players
Southport F.C. players
Barry Town United F.C. players
English Football League players